Peter Joseph Hurth, C.S.C., S.T.D. (30 March 1857 – 1 August 1935) was a Roman Catholic priest of the Congregation of the Holy Cross, a diocesan bishop in British India and the Philippines, and a titular archbishop.

Early years
Peter Joseph Hurth was born on 30 March 1857 in Nittel, Prussia (now Germany), across the Moselle River from Luxembourg.  At that time, Nittel was in the Rheinprovinz, but today it belongs to the state of Rhineland-Palatinate.  Peter was the youngest of three children of Peter Hurth (1822–1873) and his wife, Susanna Wolf (1816–1894).  In the spring of 1874, three days before his 17th birthday, he left for America.  In Antwerp, he boarded the Red Star Line steamer, the "Switzerland".  When he arrived in New York City in the morning of 8 May, so many of his companions at Castle Garden were Luxembourgers that he was mistaken for one of them.  The mistake did not bother Hurth.  Neither did the misspelling of his name - "Pierre Hurt".

Hurth had come to continue his studies so he went to his destination, the University of Notre Dame in Indiana.  There he also joined the Congregation of the Holy Cross (C.S.C.).  As a Brother, he worked as an assistant instructor of the Latin and Greek languages at the University.  On 30 March 1880 he was ordained to the priesthood.  He also graduated from the University.  Only one of his degrees was known to be a S.T.D.  He had it by 1908, when he wrote an article for an American encyclopedia.

College President
From 1880 to 1884, Hurth was the President of St. Joseph’s Commercial College (now the College of Mount Saint Joseph) in Cincinnati, Ohio. He left as an American citizen and with a new passport. He had been naturalized there on 31 March 1883. His trademark, a full, flowing beard, would come later.

Hurth’s next stop was in Austin, Texas, where he served as the President of St. Edward’s College (now St. Edward’s University) in Austin, Texas, for eight years, from 1886 to 1894.

The Bishop of Dacca
On 26 June 1894 he was appointed by Pope Leo XIII as the Bishop of Dacca in British India (now Dhaka, Bangladesh).  He was the third of his Order to have had this position.  He was consecrated to it on 16 September 1894 at the Basilica of the Sacred Heart, Notre Dame by the Bishop of Nashville, Tennessee, Joseph Rademacher, with the assistance from two other bishops, Henry Joseph Richter of Grand Rapids, Michigan and James Schwebach of La Crosse, Wisconsin.  He left at midnight for a trip that would take him to New York City, to Rome for an audience with the Pope and eventually to Dacca.

The next 14 years in Dacca were quiet and uneventful for Bishop Hurth.  In 1908, he wrote an article in English about his diocese for an American publication, The Catholic Encyclopedia.  But he was beginning to have problems with his health so, on 15 February 1909, he resigned.  On the same day, he was appointed as the Titular Bishop of Milopotamus.  His new title might be in Ancient Greece but he was in good company.  The previous holder was an Englishman, Nicholas Wiseman, before he became a Cardinal and the first Archbishop of Westminster.

But Hurth did not forget India.  In 1911, when he returned to Cincinnati, he was interviewed by a local newspaper.  When he was asked about India, he said that, since the conditions were changing slowly in India, "it was only a question of time when caste would no longer exist and child marriage would be abolished." He was in the city for the 5th National Eucharistic Congress of the Catholic Church of America.

The Bishop of Nueva Segovia
On 7 January 1913, Pope Pius X sent Hurth to the Philippines to be the Bishop of Nueva Segovia in Luzon, the largest of the islands. In Vigan City, the see of the diocese, Hurth served for another 13 years.  But, unlike Dacca, his second tour was not quiet and uneventful.  One reporter remarked that the Bishop had "the rather melancholy privilege of ruling the most afflicted diocese under the United States jurisdiction".  His see had been devastated by revolutions, typhoons, earthquakes, cyclones and deserted by the missionary funds from Europe.  The conditions were so bad – "verily in ruins" – that at least nineteen congregations did not have any buildings to hold their Masses and house their priests.  So Bishop Hurth had to send out appeals everywhere for help.  That was one of the reasons for his trip to the United States in late 1916 and early 1917.

Retirement
On 12 November 1926, Hurth resigned.  On the same day, he became Honorary Bishop of Bosra.  Two weeks later, he was on his way back to America aboard an ocean liner.  After many years in India and the Philippines, he was used to the tropical weather.  But, one Saturday, just days from New York City, he went outside for a walk around the deck and a blast of cold air gave him a "heart shock".  He had to be taken to the hospital in New York City straight from the piers.  But he quickly recovered.

Bishop Hurth even felt healthy enough in 1927 to travel to Helena, Montana, and San Antonio, Texas.  In Helena, he was the principal consecrator at the ordination of George Joseph Finnigan, C.S.C., as the Bishop of that city.  But in San Antonio he was one of the observers at the consecration of Bishop Arthur Jerome Drossaerts as the first Archbishop of San Antonio.

In spite of all his travels to faraway lands, Hurth never forgot his hometown. He visited it twice, in 1898 and 1910. In 1910, he was in Augsburg for the 57th General Assembly of the Catholics of Germany so he was mentioned, along his portrait, in the assembly’s official commemorative program.

Hurth died in Manila, the Philippines, on 1 August 1935.  His death notice mentioned that he was also a Papal count.

Legacy
In his birthplace, Nittel, there is a modern memorial plaque in the town's square for Archbishop Hurth.

References

Literature
(en) David Shavit:  The United States in Asia: A Historical Dictionary, New York, Greenwood Press, 1990, p. 256, scan from the source
(en) University of Notre Dame Archives: Guide to Manuscript Collections.  Notre Dame, University of Notre Dame Press, 1993, p. 213; snippet from the source
 (de) Hans-Josef Wietor:  Die Geschichte des Ortes Nittel [The History of the Place of Nittel], Ortschroniken des Trierer Landes, Nr. 33 [Chronicles of the Places of the Land of Trier, No. 33]. Nittel, Ortsgemeinde [Township of] Nittel, 2000, with an entire chapter about Archbishop Hurth (See the note about the book)

External links
 (en) "Archbishop Peter Joseph Hurth, C.S.C. †,"  at "Catholic Hierarchy"
 (en) "Peter Joseph Hurth Papers (HRT), Inventory of the Collections of the University of Notre Dame, The University of Notre Dame Archives, Indiana, U.S.A.

Congregation of Holy Cross bishops
German emigrants to the United States
19th-century German Roman Catholic priests
19th-century Roman Catholic bishops in India
20th-century Roman Catholic bishops in the Philippines
1857 births
1935 deaths
Roman Catholic bishops of Dhaka
Roman Catholic bishops of Nueva Segovia